Georgios Kaminis (born 15 July 1954) is a Greek American parliamentarian and professor of constitutional law. He was the Greek Ombudsman from April 2003 until September 2010 and Mayor of Athens from 2011 until 2019.

Early life
Giorgos Kaminis was born in New York City, where his father, Vasilis Kaminis was working at the time. He holds both Greek and American citizenship. At the age of five he left New York and moved to Athens.

Education
He studied at the Faculty of Law of the University of Athens, graduating in 1980. He conducted postgraduate studies in public law at Panthéon-Assas University, gaining a MAS in 1982, followed by the Panthéon-Sorbonne University, where he obtained a doctorat d'État en droit in 1989.

Career 
In November 1982, he was hired as a research and teaching fellow at the Faculty of Law of the University of Athens. He was elected a lecturer in 1991 and an assistant professor in 1998.

From September 1989, he has been a research fellow at the Department of Parliamentary Studies and Research of the Directorate of Studies of the Greek Parliament.

Greek Ombudsman
Αfter serving as a Deputy Ombudsman for Human Rights, from 1998 to 2003, he served as the Greek Ombudsman from April 2003 until his resignation in September 2010, to run in upcoming local elections.

Mayor of Athens
Kaminis was elected Mayor of Athens after the second round of the Greek local elections of 2010. Kaminis, who ran as an independent, had been nominated by the small, newly formed Democratic Left party and was also backed by the country's ruling Panhellenic Socialist Movement, the Ecologist Greens and Portokali (Drassi and the Liberal Alliance). He won 52% of the vote in the second round of voting, defeating Nikitas Kaklamanis, the centre-right incumbent supported by New Democracy and the Popular Orthodox Rally. He was the first left-of-centre candidate elected mayor of the Greek capital, historically a conservative stronghold, in more than two decades. He was re-elected in 2014, defeating the Syriza candidate Gabriel Sakellaridis in the second round.

Renewal
On 24 February 2018, he announced the formation of a political tendency called Renewal within the Movement for Change, a nascent political alliance of centre-left parties formed around PASOK. On 7 July 2019, he was one of the 12 candidates elected to the Hellenic Parliament through party-list proportional representation. On 22 June 2022, he announced that he would not contest the next election.

Personal life
Kaminis is married to Adamantia Anagnostou, a lecturer at the University of Macedonia. They have two daughters, Angeliki and Katerina-Markella.

Publications

References

External links
Official website
"In contest for the capital’s heart and soul" Interview of Giorgios Kaminis in Athens Plus.

1954 births
Living people
Ombudsmen in Greece
American agnostics
American emigrants to Greece
Greek agnostics
National and Kapodistrian University of Athens alumni
Academic staff of the National and Kapodistrian University of Athens
Mayors of Athens
Politicians from New York City
Paris 2 Panthéon-Assas University alumni
Greek MPs 2019–2023